A Ass Pocket of Whiskey is the seventh studio album by the American Mississippi Hill Country Bluesman R.L. Burnside and the American punk blues band Jon Spencer Blues Explosion, released on Matador Records on 18 June 1996. Unusually, The Penguin Guide to Blues Recordings gave the album two contrasting ratings, indicating divided critical opinion.

Track listing
All songs by R.L. Burnside, Jon Spencer, Judah Bauer and Russell Simins (except where otherwise noted).

"Goin' Down South"
"Boogie Chillen" (John Lee Hooker)
"Poor Boy"
"2 Brothers"
"Snake Drive" (Burnside)
"Shake 'Em On Down" (Bukka White (although the album credits the song to 'Burnside')
"Criminal Inside Me"
"Walkin' Blues" (Son House (although the album credits the song to 'Burnside')
"Tojo Told Hitler"
"Have You Ever Been Lonely?"

Personnel
R.L. Burnside - vocals, guitar
Kenny Brown - guitar
Judah Bauer - guitar, harmonica, vocals, Casio SK-1
Russell Simins - drums
Jon Spencer - guitar, vocals, drums, theremin

References

1996 albums
R. L. Burnside albums
Jon Spencer Blues Explosion albums